The Nagapattnam Refinery also known as Cauvery Basin Refinery was the second oil refinery constructed by Chennai Petroleum Corporation Limited.  It is situated at Kaveri Basin at Nagapattinam. The initial unit was set up in Nagapattinam with a capacity of 0.5 million metric tonnes per annum in 1993 but later on in 2002 this was boosted to 1 million metric tonnes per annum.  LPG is separated out in a gas treating unit built in 1996.

References

Oil refineries in India
Companies based in Tamil Nadu
Energy in Tamil Nadu
Indian Oil Corporation buildings and structures
1993 establishments in Tamil Nadu
Energy infrastructure completed in 1993
Buildings and structures in Nagapattinam district
20th-century architecture in India